New Zealand competed at the 1988 Summer Olympics in Seoul, South Korea. 83 competitors, 67 men and 16 women, took part in 58 events in 16 sports. In addition, New Zealand sent four women to compete in Taekwondo, which was one of the Olympic Games' demonstration sports. Sports administrator Bruce Ullrich was New Zealand's Chef de Mission, after previously having had that role for the 1982 and 1986 Commonwealth Games.

Medal tables

Competitors
The following table lists the number of New Zealand competitors participating at the Games according to gender and sport.

Archery

New Zealand's 1988 archery team included only one woman, veteran Ann Shurrock.

Athletics

Track and road

Combined

Canoeing

Cycling

Thirteen cyclists, twelve men and one woman, represented New Zealand in 1988.

Road

Track
Men's 1 km time trial

Men's individual pursuit

Men's team pursuit

Equestrian

Eventing

Jumping

Individual

Team

Fencing

One male fencer represented New Zealand in 1988.

Gymnastics

Rhythmic

Women's individual all-around

Judo

Rowing

Men

Women

Sailing

New Zealand had thirteen competitors in Seoul; eleven men and two women.

Shooting

Men's 50 m rifle, prone

Men's 50 m pistol

Mixed skeet

Swimming

Table tennis

Tennis

Weightlifting

Wrestling

Demonstration sports

Taekwondo

References

Nations at the 1988 Summer Olympics
1988
Summer Olympics